Gábor Buna (born 24 May 2002) is a Hungarian football defender who plays for Kecskemét.

Career statistics

References

External links
 
 

2002 births
Living people
People from Kaposvár
Hungarian footballers
Hungary youth international footballers
Association football defenders
Budapest Honvéd FC players
Kecskeméti TE players
Nemzeti Bajnokság I players
Nemzeti Bajnokság II players
Sportspeople from Somogy County